SOPHiA GENETICS is a data-driven medicine software company with headquarters in Lausanne, Switzerland and Boston, Massachusetts. It provides genomic and radiomic analysis for hospitals, laboratories, and biopharma institutions. The company was ranked among the 50 smartest companies by the MIT Technology Review in 2017. The company went public on the Nasdaq in 2021, floating at $1.1B.

History 
Sophia Genetics was co-founded by Dr. Jurgi Camblong, Dr. Pierre Hutter, and Prof. Lars Steinmetz in 2011 as a start-up at École Polytechnique Fédérale de Lausanne (EPFL). It began as a research tool for hospitals and federally regulated health care labs, and then expanded to biopharma institutions.

In 2014, the company introduced an analytical software platform, the SOPHiA DDM Platform (Data-Driven Medicine), which helps to interpret circulating tumor DNA and circulating tumour cells in blood, urine, cerebral spinal fluid and other liquid samples. The SOPHiA DDM Platform is a Cloud-based, Software-as-a-Service that uses machine learning and AI algorithms to provide genomic insights to doctors and researchers from complex multimodal datasets. Insights are shared across the platform with all participating institutions. This means that as the user-base scales, the AI becomes smarter and more accurate as it’s fed more data. The platform is used for oncology, hereditary cancers, metabolic disorders, pediatrics, cardiology, and for rare disease research.

The company initially designed the platform to help hospitals with processing and storing large genomic data-sets, but research showed that the more pressing problem was data accuracy. That then became the platform's primary focus. The startup worked with hospitals to benchmark DNA samples analyzed via their sequencing systems, and then trained algorithms of their own to perform the diagnosing process automatically and recognize relevant patterns in the genome data. The algorithms were built bottom-up from raw FASTQ data.

To use the platform, DNA is extracted from a patient sample, enriched, and sequenced by an NGS machine. Once this data has been digitized, it is loaded into the platform. The SOPHiA DDM Platform's AI algorithms then pull out unique genetic variants and pre-classifies data according to pathogenic predictions. Doctors and researchers can then review the detected variants and take action – the SOPHiA DDM Platform in turn learns from those actions

In 2017, Sophia Genetics was ranked as one of the 50 smartest companies in the world by the MIT Tech Review.

In 2018, the company set up its first research and development center in France and made acquisition of a France-based molecular biology and genetic analytics software development company, Interactive Biosoftware. That same year, Sophia Genetics opened its U.S. headquarters in Boston, Massachusetts. At the time, the company was supporting more than 100 university hospitals in the U.S.. It also received the Salus Partner Excellence in HealthTech Award in 2018. 

In 2020, the company appointed Troy Cox, former board of directors member, as its new chairman, and Lara Hashimoto as chief business officer. In August, the company released a data analysis solution that was focused on predicting the disease evolution of the SARS-CoV-2 virus. The platform’s AI system was designed to conduct a full-genome analysis of the virus. It then combines that data with patient genetic information, and clinical data such as the results of lung and CT scans to discover abnormalities predictive of disease evolution. Sophia Genetics also received the Best Overall Genomics Company in the 2020 MedTech Breakthrough Awards.

In 2021, the company was named a Microsoft Partner of the Year finalist and went public, now listed on the Nasdaq. At the time, its platform was in use at more than 750 hospitals, laboratories, and biopharma institutions around the world and had analyzed over 770,000 genomic profiles worldwide.

In 2022, Sophia Genetics was named one of the 100 Best Places to Work in Boston by Built in Boston.

Also in 2022, the firm began development of a new method for detecting extrachromosomal DNA through collaboration with startup firm Boundless Bio.

Funding 
The company has been through multiple rounds of funding.

In September 2013, as part of a Series A round of funding, Sophia Genetics received $3 million for its medical software platform.

A Series B round of funding in 2014 raised $13.75 million from Swisscom and Endeavour Vision.

In a December 2015 Series C round of funding, Sophia Genetics raised $15 million from Omega Pharma founder and healthcare scion Marc Coucke.

In September 2017, as part of a Series D round of funding, the company received $30 million from UK-based VC firm Balderton Capital to its investor list.

The company raised $77 million in January 2019 as part of a Series E round of funding. The round was led by Generation Investment Management.

In October 2020, as part of a Series F round of funding, The company raised $110 million. The round was led by aMoon a health-tech and life sciences venture fund based in Israel, and Hitachi Ventures, a venture arm of Japanese Hitachi Group.

In 2021, Sophia Genetics went public, trading under the symbol SOPH on the Nasdaq. The company raised $234 million in its IPO and was backed by J.P. Morgan, Morgan Stanley, Cowen, and Credit Suisse.

Partnership 
In 2016, Sophia Genetics entered into a comarketing agreement with Illumina allowing the two companies to promote adoption of next- generation DNA sequencing.

In 2019, Sophia Genetics formed partnerships with Integrated DNA Technologies and Paragon Genomics, next-generation sequencing (NGS) assay development company, to provide COVID-19 test kits

In 2021, the company partnered with MGI, a subsidiary of BGI Group, to enable their users to access the SOPHiA DDM Platform for data analysis and interpretation. In March 2021,  Sophia Genetics announced a long-term collaboration agreement with Hitachi. In July of that year, Sophia Genetics joined with GE Healthcare to match cancer patients to the best possible treatment plans based on their specific genomic signature, cancer type, and overall health history. The partnership combines technologies from SOPHiA DDM Platform and GE’s medical imaging and monitoring tools, as well as the Edison data aggregation platform. The companies will also research additional opportunities for collaboration in the fields of digital oncology and radiogenomic analysis .

In 2022, the firm committed to a collaboration with Memorial Sloan Kettering Cancer Center to advance predictive tumor analysis and, more broadly, clinical decision support.  This benefits the firm in part by providing access to MSK-IMPACT, the Center's proprietary tumor sequencing database.

References

External links
 

Companies established in 2011
Cloud databases
Companies listed on the Nasdaq
Software companies of Switzerland
Technology companies based in the Boston area
Software companies of the United States
Research support companies